The Graveyard Book is a young adult novel by the English author Neil Gaiman, simultaneously published in Britain and America in 2008. The Graveyard Book traces the story of the boy Nobody "Bod" Owens who is adopted and reared by the supernatural occupants of a graveyard after his family is brutally murdered.

Gaiman won both the British Carnegie Medal and the American Newbery Medal recognizing the year's best children's books, the first time both named the same work. The Graveyard Book also won the annual Hugo Award for Best Novel from the World Science Fiction Convention and Locus Award for Best Young Adult Book selected by Locus Magazine subscribers.

Chris Riddell, who illustrated the British children's edition, made the Kate Greenaway Medal shortlist. It was the first time in the award's 30-year history that one book made both the author and illustrator shortlists. Time magazine included the novel in its list of the 100 Best Young-Adult Books of All Time.

Concept and development
Gaiman first had the idea for the story in 1985, after seeing his then-two-year-old son Mike "pedaling his tricycle around a graveyard" near their home in East Grinstead, West Sussex.  Recalling how comfortable his son looked there, Gaiman thought he "could write something a lot like The Jungle Book and set it in a graveyard." When he sat down to write, however, Gaiman decided he was "not yet a good enough writer" and came to the same conclusion as he revisited it every few years. He eventually published it in 2008.

The bulk of the book is about the protagonist's adventures in and out of the graveyard in which he lives as he grows up. Throughout his adventures, Bod learns supernatural abilities such as Fading (allows Bod to turn invisible, but only if no one is paying attention to him), Haunting (which allows Bod to make people feel uneasy, though this ability can be amplified to terrify them), and Dreamwalking (going into others' dreams and controlling the dream, though he cannot cause physical harm).Each of the eight chapters is a short story, each set two years after the preceding chapter. Some chapters have analogues to Rudyard Kipling's 1894 work; for example, the chapter "The Hounds of God" parallels the story "Kaa's Hunting".

Plot
The story begins as the man Jack murders three members of a family (later revealed to be the Dorian family), but fails to kill the youngest child, a one-and-a-half-year-old boy. Unknown to him, the toddler has climbed out of his crib to explore. The child crawls out of the house and up a hill to a graveyard where ghosts find him. His mother, as a ghost, asks them to protect the child, and they argue about whether to do this until the Lady on the Grey (implied to be the Angel of Death) appears and states "The dead should have charity". The ghosts accept, and Mrs. Owens (the ghost who first discovered the baby) and her husband, Mr. Owens, become his adoptive parents. The baby is named Nobody Owens (since Mrs. Owens declares "He looks like nobody except himself") and is granted the Freedom of the Graveyard, which allows Nobody to pass through solid objects when in the graveyard, including its gates. The caretaker Silas (subsequently implied to be an ancient and formerly evil vampire, now reformed) agrees to act as Nobody's 'guardian', providing for and protecting him. The man Jack is persuaded by Silas that the toddler isn't there, and leaves.

As a young child, Nobody (often called Bod) begins learning to read and write and befriends a girl called Scarlett Perkins, whose parents regularly bring her to play in the graveyard. It is with her that Bod discovers a creature called the Sleer, who has been waiting for thousands of years within a prehistoric barrow for his "Master" to come and reclaim him along with the treasures he guards (a knife, a goblet, and brooch respectively). The Sleer initially attempts to scare the two away with a ghostly projection, but Bod sees through the ruse and the Sleer relents. Scarlett's parents believe she has gone missing during this adventure. Shortly afterward, the family moves to Scotland.
Silas temporarily leaves the graveyard 'to obtain some information, and Miss Lupescu arrives to take care of six-year-old Bod in his absence. She brings Bod home-made food and tutors him, as Bod grows a distaste for Miss Lupescu's strictness and unique cooking. Bod is then tricked by the Ghouls, a race of corpse-eating creatures that live in an alternate dimension accessed by a special grave called a Ghoulgate. After being brought through a Ghoulgate and finding out the Ghoul's true intent to either convert him into one of their own or eat him, Bod is forced into a sack and carried to the Ghoul city Ghûlheim. After cutting his way out of the sack with a loose nail, Bod is subsequently rescued by Miss Lupescu, discovering she is a Hound of God (i.e. a werewolf). The two's relationship improves after the event, and Bod asks a returned Silas if Miss Lupescu could come to teach him again in the future.

Bod befriends Elizabeth 'Elsa' Hempstock, the ghost of an unjustly executed witch buried in an unmarked grave. Liza's grave is located on the other side of the fence where suicides, criminals, and witches are buried separate from the main Graveyard grounds. Bod attempts to pawn the Sleer's brooch to buy Liza a headstone after learning her story. He is kidnapped by the pawnshop owner, Abanazer Bolger, who is one of Man Jack's contacts, but escapes and returns the brooch to the Sleer's altar. He gives Liza a homemade headstone made from a paperweight instead, marking it "E.H. We Don't Forget".

In a short story based on the allegorical Danse Macabre, Bod observes the preparation of and participates in a folk dance with the dead inhabitants of the graveyard and the living inhabitants of the local area. He meets the Lady on the Grey, who promises him that one day he will ride on her horse with her: "Everyone does." After the dance ends and the living and dead return to their homes, the ground is covered in small white flowers that had been handed out by the mayor: "It looked as if there had been a wedding." Later, Bod wants to discuss the experience with his undead friends but learns that it is considered a 'forbidden' subject.
On Bod's 14th year at the graveyard, Scarlett and her mother come back to the town, and she and Bod reunite. Scarlett has also made friends with a historian called Mr. Jay Frost who is living in a house not too far from the graveyard. Researching the murder of Bod's family, Scarlett learns that the historian lives in the house that Bod's family once lived in. Bod visits the house, to learn more about his family. When showing Bod the room he lived in as a baby, Mr. Frost reveals that he actually is the Man Jack; Jack Frost is his full name.

Bod is chased by the Man Jack and four other members of the Jacks of All Trades. Bod and Scarlett escape to the graveyard where Bod can defeat each Jack separately, except for Jack Frost. Jack Frost takes Scarlett captive in the chamber of the Sleer but is then tricked by Bod into claiming to be the Sleer's master. The Sleer engulfs Jack Frost in an "embrace", and they disappear into the wall, presumably "protecting him from the world", forever. Silas returns, and it is revealed that he and Miss Lupescu are members of the Honour Guard, devoted to protecting "the borders between things". Two other supernatural beings (the Ifrit Haroun and the winged mummy Kandar), have fought the Jacks of All Trades throughout the novel. Though they succeed in destroying society, Miss Lupescu is killed in battle, to Silas and Bod's great sorrow.
Scarlett is shocked and appalled by the events of the night and Bod's ethically questionable actions in the course of defeating Jack Frost. Silas suggests the best course is to remove most of her memories of Bod and what happened that night. Bod disagrees with Silas, but Scarlett ends up with her memories taken anyway. Silas uses his power of suggestion to convince Scarlett and her mother to return to Glasgow.

In the final chapter of the book, Bod is "about 15" and is slowly losing the Freedom of the Graveyard and even his ability to see ghosts. At the end of the book, Silas gives Bod some money and a passport. Bod says his goodbyes to his ghostly family and friends and leaves the graveyard to embark on the rest of his life.

Publication history
The fourth chapter, "The Witch's Headstone", was published as a short story in the Gaiman anthology M Is for Magic and in Wizards: Magical Tales from the Masters of Modern Fantasy and won the 2008 Locus Award for Best Novelette.  The book was released on 30 September 2008 in the United States by HarperCollins and on 31 October 2008 in the United Kingdom by Bloomsbury Publishing. The cover and interior illustrations of the US edition were created by longtime Gaiman collaborator Dave McKean; he illustrated the UK edition for the adult market. The simultaneous British Children's Edition was illustrated by Chris Riddell, for which he made the 2010 Greenaway Medal shortlist.

Subterranean Press published an American limited edition with a different cover and interior illustrations by McKean.

HarperAudio published an audiobook edition read by Gaiman. It includes a version of "Danse macabre" played by Béla Fleck, which Fleck provided after reading on Gaiman's blog that he hoped for "Danse Macabre with banjo in it". It won Audiobook of the Year (the "Audie") from the Audiobook Publisher's Association (US).

In 2014, HarperAudio published a full-cast audiobook edition performed by Derek Jacobi (narrator), Robert Madge (Bod), Clare Corbett, Miriam Margolyes (Mrs. Owens), Andrew Scott (the Man Jack), Julian Rhind-Tutt (Silas), Emilia Fox, Reece Shearsmith, Lenny Henry, and an ensemble cast. Special content in this edition includes the story behind The Graveyard Book, written and performed by Gaiman. This edition won the 2015 Audie Award Distinguished Achievement in Production.

Critical reception
The Graveyard Book was cited by the American Library Association for its "delicious mix of murder, fantasy, humor and human longing", noting its "magical, haunting prose". The New York Times Monica Edinger was very positive about the book, concluding, "In this novel of wonder, Neil Gaiman follows in the footsteps of long-ago storytellers, weaving a tale of unforgettable enchantment". Kirkus Reviews awarded it a starred review, claiming that, "this needs to be read by anyone who is or has ever been a child". Author Patrick Ness wrote, "what's lost in forward momentum is more than made up for by the outrageous riches of Gaiman's imagination" and praised the villains. The Independent praised the novel's different tones. Richard Bleiler described the novel as a piece of neo-Gothic fiction echoing back to Horace Walpole's The Castle of Otranto. In 2013, a blogger recommended The Graveyard Book for children, describing the premise as "staggeringly original" and the structure "satisfyingly episodic".

Awards

Chris Riddell made the Greenaway Medal shortlist for his illustrations of the Children's Edition.

Gaiman and Harper Audio won the 2009 Audie Award for their audiobook edition.

HarperAudio's full-cast edition won the 2015 Audie Award Distinguished Achievement in Production.

Possible film adaptation
In January 2009, filmmaker Neil Jordan signed on to write and direct a film adaptation for Miramax. In May 2010, CJ Entertainment, associated with Chris Columbus's 1492 Pictures, acquired the rights for distribution in Korea and Japan and agreed to co-finance the adaptation.

In April 2012, Walt Disney Pictures acquired the rights and hired Henry Selick, director of The Nightmare Before Christmas and the film adaptation of Gaiman's novel Coraline, to direct The Graveyard Book. The film was moved to Pixar, which would have been the company's first adapted work. After the studio and Selick parted ways over scheduling and development, it was announced in January 2013 that Ron Howard would be directing the film, but he was dropped out to work on other projects as well, thus the film was in development hell for some time.

Graphic novel adaptation
Artist P. Craig Russell, along with Galen Showman, Kevin Nowlan, Jill Thompson, David Lafuente, Stephen Scott, Scott Hampton and Tony Harris, has adapted the book into a two-volume graphic novel. The first volume was released on 29 July 2014, followed by the second on 7 October.

See also

Notes

References

External links
  —immediately, UK Adult Edition 
 The Graveyard Book at Mouse Circus, The Official Neil Gaiman Website for Young Readers
 First look at The Graveyard Book Graphic Novel, Vol 1 —Artist P. Craig Russell examines his proof copy

2008 British novels
2008 children's books
2008 fantasy novels
British fantasy novels
Children's fantasy novels
Newbery Medal–winning works
Carnegie Medal in Literature winning works
Hugo Award for Best Novel-winning works
Novels about orphans
Fiction about cemeteries
Jack tales
Novels by Neil Gaiman
HarperCollins books
Bloomsbury Publishing books
Ghost novels
Vampire novels
Werewolf novels
Witchcraft in written fiction